A Tory is a person who holds a political philosophy known as Toryism, based on a British version of traditionalism and conservatism, which upholds social order as it has evolved in the English culture throughout history. The Tory ethos has been summed up with the phrase "God, King, and Country". Tories are monarchists, were historically of a high church Anglican religious heritage, and opposed to the liberalism of the Whig faction. 

The philosophy originates from the Cavalier faction, a royalist group during the English Civil War. The Tories political faction that emerged in 1681 was a reaction to the Whig-controlled Parliaments that succeeded the Cavalier Parliament. As a political term, Tory was an insult derived from the Irish language, that later entered English politics during the Exclusion Crisis of 1678–1681.

It also has exponents in other parts of the former British Empire, such as the Loyalists of British America, who opposed US secession during the American War of Independence. The Loyalists who fled to the Canadas at the end of the American Revolution, the United Empire Loyalists, formed the support base for political cliques in Upper and Lower Canada.

Toryism remains prominent in Canada and the United Kingdom. The British Conservative Party and Conservative Party of Canada, and their members, continue to be referred to as Tories. Adherents to traditional Toryism in contemporary times are referred to as High Tories, who typically defend the ideas of hierarchy, natural order, and aristocracy.

Etymology
The word Tory originates from an Irish term that was phonetically anglicised. Several Irish words have been suggested as the etymological root for the word Tory. The Irish word toruidhe or toruighe, meaning "to pursue" or "to hunt", is suggested as the origin for the term Tory. From the 1500s to 1600s, the term Tory first emerged to refer to the Irish who were dispossessed of their lands and took to the woods, forming themselves into bands that subsisted on wild animals and goods taken from settlers. After these activities were suppressed, the term lost its original signification with English-speakers and was used to describe "an outlaw papist" or a "robber that is noted for outrages and cruelty". The Irish peasantry also used the term Tory to refer to an outlaw or a miscreant of any kind into the 19th century. However, because later Conservative and anti-revolutionary parties assumed the term Tory, it has also been suggested that the word originated from the Irish word toir, meaning to give, grant and bestow; or toirbhearl, meaning efficiency, bounty or munificence.

By the 1640s, the term was used in the English language to refer to dispossessed Irish Catholics. It was also used to refer to isolated Irish rebels and guerrillas resisting Oliver Cromwell's Cromwellian conquest of Ireland (1649 to 1650), who were allied with Cavaliers through treaty with the Parliament of Confederate Ireland. It was later used to refer to dispossessed Catholic Irish in Ulster following the Restoration. Tory was also used to refer to a rapparee and later applied to Confederates or Cavaliers in arms.

The term Tory was first introduced in England by Titus Oates, who used the term to describe individuals from Ireland sent to assassinate Oates and his supporters. Oates continued to refer to his opponents as Tories until his death. The word entered English politics during the 1680s, emerging as a pejorative term to describe supporters of James II of England during the Exclusion Crisis and his hereditary right to inherit the throne despite his Catholic religion. After this, the term Tory began to be used as a colloquial term, alongside the word Whig, to describe the two major political factions/parties in British politics. Initially, both terms were used in a pejorative manner, although both later became acceptable terms to use in literary speech to describe either political party. The suffix -ism was quickly added to both Whig and Tory to make Whiggism and Toryism, meaning the principles and methods of each faction.

During the American Revolution, the term Tory was used interchangeably with the term Loyalists to refer to colonists that remained loyal to the Crown during that conflict. The term contrasts the colloquial term used to describe supporters of the revolution, Patriot.

Political history

Towards the end of Charles II's reign (1660–1685) there was some debate about whether his brother, James, Duke of York, should be allowed to accede to the throne because of James's Catholicism. "Whigs", originally a reference to Scottish cattle-drovers (stereotypically radical anti-Catholic Covenanters), was the abusive term directed at those who wanted to exclude James on the grounds that he was a Catholic. Those who were not prepared to exclude James were labelled "Abhorrers" and later "Tories". Titus Oates applied the term Tory, which then signified an Irish robber, to those who would not believe in his Popish Plot and the name gradually became extended to all who were supposed to have sympathy with the Catholic Duke of York.

United Kingdom

The Tory political faction originally emerged within the Parliament of England to uphold the legitimist rights of James II to succeed his brother Charles II to the thrones of the three kingdoms. James became a Catholic at a time when the state institutions were fiercely independent from the Catholic Church—this was an issue for the Exclusion Crisis supporting Patricians, the political heirs to the nonconformist Roundheads and Covenanters. During the Exclusion Crisis, the word Tory was applied in the Kingdom of England as a nickname to the opponents of the bill, called the Abhorrers. The word "Tory" had connotations of Papist and outlaw derived from its previous use in Ireland.

There were two Tory ministries after James II acceded to the throne: the first led by the Earl of Rochester, the second by Lord Belasyse. A significant faction took part in the Glorious Revolution the military coup d'etat that ousted James II with the Whigs to defend the Church of England and definitive Protestantism. A large but dwindling faction of Tories continued to support James in exile and his Stuart heirs to the throne, especially in 1714 after the Hanoverian Succession by George I, the first Hanoverian monarch. Although only a minority of Tories gave their adhesion to the Jacobite risings, this was used by the Whigs to discredit the Tories and paint them as traitors. After the advent of the Prime Ministerial system under the Whig Robert Walpole, Lord Bute's premiership in the reign of George III marked a revival. Under the Corn Laws (1815–1846) a majority of Tories supported protectionist agrarianism with tariffs being imposed at the time for higher food prices, self-sufficiency and enhanced wages in rural employment.

English Tories from the time of the Glorious Revolution up until the Reform Act 1832 were characterised by strong monarchist tendencies, support for the Church of England and hostility to radical reform, while the Tory party was an actual organisation which held power intermittently throughout the same period. Conservatism began to emerge in the late 18th century—it synthesised moderate Whig economic policies and many Tory social values to create a new political philosophy and faction in opposition to the French Revolution. Edmund Burke and William Pitt the Younger led the way in this. Interventionism and strong armed forces were to prove a hallmark of Toryism under subsequent prime ministers. The word Conservative began to be used in place of Tory during the 1830s, as Robert Peel's followers began to re-interpret elements of Tory tradition under a banner of support for social reform and free trade. The party was eventually succeeded by the Conservative and Unionist Party, with the term Tory enduring to become an interchangeable phrase with Conservative.

Canada

The term Tory was first used to designate the pre-Confederation British ruling classes of Upper Canada and Lower Canada, known as the Family Compact and the Château Clique, an elite within the governing classes and often members within a section of society known as the United Empire Loyalists. The United Empire Loyalists were American loyalists from the Thirteen Colonies who resettled elsewhere in British North America during or after the American Revolutionary War.

In post-Confederation Canada, the terms "Red Tory" and "Blue Tory" have long been used to describe the two wings of the Conservative and previously the Progressive Conservative (PC) parties. The dyadic tensions originally arose out of the 1854 political union of British-Canadian Tories, French-Canadian traditionalists and the monarchist and loyalist leaning sections of the emerging commercial classes at the time—many of whom were uncomfortable with the pro-American and annexationist tendencies within the liberal Clear Grits. Tory strength and prominence in the political culture was a feature of life in Nova Scotia, New Brunswick, Prince Edward Island, Ontario and Manitoba.

By the 1930s, the factions within Canadian Toryism were associated with either the urban business elites, or with rural traditionalists from the country's hinterland. A "Red Tory" is a member of the more moderate wing of the party (in the manner of John Farthing and George Grant). They are generally unified by their adherence to British traditions in Canada.

Throughout the course of Canadian history, the Conservative Party was generally controlled by MacDonaldian Tory elements, which in Canada meant an adherence to the English-Canadian traditions of Monarchy, Empire-Commonwealth, parliamentary government, nationalism, protectionism, social reform and eventually acceptance of the necessity of the welfare state.

By the 1970s, the Progressive Conservative Party was a Keynesian-consensus party. With the onset of stagflation in the 1970s, some Canadian Tories came under the influence of neo-liberal developments in the United Kingdom and the United States, which highlighted the policies for privatization and supply-side interventions. In Canada, these tories have been labeled neoconservatives—which has a somewhat different connotation in the United States. By the early 1980s, there was no clear neoconservative in the Tory leadership cadre, but Brian Mulroney (who became leader in 1983) eventually came to adopt many policies from the Margaret Thatcher and Ronald Reagan governments.

As Mulroney took the Progressive Conservative Party further in this direction, with policy initiatives in the areas of deregulation, privatization, free-trade and a consumption tax called the Goods and services tax (GST), many traditionally-minded Tories became concerned that a political and cultural schism was occurring within the party.

The 1986 creation of the Reform Party of Canada attracted some of the neo-liberals and social conservatives away from the Tory party and as some of the neoconservative policies of the Mulroney government proved unpopular, some of the provincial-rights elements moved towards Reform as well. In 1993, Mulroney resigned rather than fight an election based on his record after almost nine years in power. This left the Progressive Conservatives in disarray and scrambling to understand how to make Toryism relevant in provinces such as Quebec, Saskatchewan, Alberta and British Columbia that had never had a strong tory tradition and political culture.

Thereafter in the 1990s, the Progressive Conservatives were a small party in the House of Commons of Canada and could only exert legislative pressure on the government through their power in the Senate of Canada. Eventually, through death and retirements, this power waned. Joe Clark returned as leader, but the schism with the Reformers effectively watered down the combined Blue and Red Tory vote in Canada.

By the late 1990s, there was talk of the necessity of uniting the right in Canada, to deter further Liberal Party majorities. Many tories—both red and blue—opposed such moves, while others took the view that all would have to be pragmatic if there was any hope of reviving a strong party system. The Canadian Alliance party (as the Reform Party had become) and some leading tories came together on an informal basis to see if they could find common ground. While Progressive Conservative Leader Joe Clark rebuffed the notion, the talks moved ahead and eventually in December 2003, the Canadian Alliance and the Progressive Conservative parties voted to rejoin into a new party called the Conservative Party of Canada.

After the merger of the Progressive Conservatives with the Canadian Alliance in 2003, there was debate as to whether the "Tory" appellation should survive at the federal level. Commentators speculated that some Alliance members would take offence to the term. Nevertheless, it was officially adopted by the merged party during the 2004 leadership convention. Stephen Harper, former leader of the Conservative Party of Canada and Prime Minister from 2006 to 2015, regularly refers to himself as a Tory and says the new party is a natural evolution of the conservative political movement. However, there were some dissident Red Tories who were against the merger. They formed the rival Progressive Canadian Party.

United States

 
The term "Loyalist" was used in the American Revolution for those who remained loyal to the British Crown.  About 80% of the Loyalists remained in the United States after the war. The 60,000 or so Loyalists who settled in Nova Scotia, Quebec, the Bahamas, or returned to Great Britain after the American War of Independence are known as United Empire Loyalists.

On February 12, 1798, Thomas Jefferson (of the Democratic-Republican Party) described the conservative Federalist Party as "[a] political Sect [...] believing that the executive is the branch of our government which the most needs support, [who] are called federalists, sometimes aristocrats or monocrats, and sometimes Tories, after the corresponding sect in the English Government of exactly the same definition".<ref>letter to John Wise in Francis N. Thorpe, ed "A Letter from Jefferson on the Political Parties, 1798," American Historical Review v.3#3 (April 1898) pp 488–89</ref> However, that was clearly a hostile description by the Federalists' foes of whom Jefferson was one and not a name used by the Federalists themselves. The Federalist Party was dissolved in 1835 with no successor parties.

Later the Democratic-Republican Party splintered in different parties, with the two dissidences being the National Republican Party and the Whig Party. The rest of the party would become the Democratic Party. The Republican National Party would then merge with the Whig Party, giving rise to what would be called the Second Party System. Before the American Civil War two major parties dominated the political landscape: the Democratic Party and the Whig Party. A British traveler in the US at the time, due to the names of the parties being partially similar to of the parties of his homeland, could considered the Democrats at this time period to be the "American Tories", as the party that opposed them was called the "Whig Party" in addition to the fact that the Democratic Party of the epoch had positions considered conservative at the time (for example, it was against the abolition of slavery). But the term "tories" had already completely fallen out of favor in the US.

The Whig Party was dissolved in 1856, but before this year most Northern Whigs eventually joined the anti-slavery Republican Party and most Southern Whigs joined the nativist American Party (dissolved in 1860). After the war the then conservative Democratic Party and the then liberal Republican Party became the two major political parties in the country. During the 20th century the two parties had an ideological shift: the modern Republican Party became a conservative party, meanwhile the modern Democratic Party, on the other hand, became a liberal party (the meaning of "liberal" in the United States is often different from that known in other countries of the English-speaking world, as the word almost everywhere in the world refers to classical liberalism — which is even defended by Republicans —, in the United States it is used usually to describe advocates of interventionist policies aimed at social democracy or social liberalism).

Texas Revolution
In Texas in 1832–1836, support for the Texas Revolution was not unanimous. The "Tories" were men who supported the Mexican government. The Tories generally were long-term property holders whose roots were outside of the lower south. They typically had little interest in politics and sought conciliation rather than war. The Tories wanted to preserve the economic, political and social gains that they enjoyed as citizens of Mexico and the revolution threatened to jeopardize those gains.

Current usageTory has become shorthand for a member of the Conservative Party or for the party in general in Canada and the UK, and can be used interchangeably with the word Conservative.

North America
In the United States, Tory is often used as a historical term to describe supporters of Great Britain during the American Revolution. However, in Canadian parlance, British supporters during the revolution are called Loyalists, with the term Tory being used as a contemporary political term.

In Canada, a Tory refers to a member of the Conservative Party of Canada, while the party as a whole are colloquially referred to as the Tories. In addition to the federal party, the term has been used in Canada to refer to members of provincial Conservative/Progressive Conservative parties, or the party as a whole. It is also used to refer to the Conservative Party's predecessor parties, including the Progressive Conservative Party of Canada. The term is used in contrast to the Grits, another colloquialism for the Liberal Party of Canada. LGBTory is an advocacy group for LGBT supporters of the Conservative Party of Canada and provincial conservative parties.

In Canada, the terms "Blue Tory" and "Red Tory" have been used to describe the two different factions of the federal and provincial conservative parties. The term "Purple Tory" was also used by the former leader of the Progressive Conservative Party of Ontario, Tim Hudak, to describe himself. Hudak used the term "Purple Tory" in an effort to avoid a strong ideological stance, and to provide a conciliatory position between red tories and blue tories. In addition, the term "Pink Tory" is used in Canadian politics as a pejorative term to describe a member of the conservative party who is perceived as liberal.

United Kingdom

In the United Kingdom, the Conservative and Unionist Party is often colloquially referred to as the Tories, both by themselves and by opponents, and also in the media. Members and voters of the party are also often referred to as "Tories" as well. In Scotland, the term Tory is used to describe members and supporters of the Scottish Conservatives, or to accuse other parties of being insufficiently opposed to that party. For example, members and supporters of the Scottish Labour Party (especially those from the "Blairite" faction) may be referred to as Red Tories by traditional Labour members and advocates of an independent Scotland. Similarly, Labour supporters have referred to Scottish National Party members and supporters as being Tartan Tories.

The British Broadcasting Corporation's own style guide permits the use of the term Tory, although requires the term Conservative be used in its first instance.

Australia
In Australia, Tory is occasionally used as a pejorative term by members of the Australian Labor Party to refer to conservative members of the Liberal Party of Australia and National Party of Australia parties (who are in a long-standing coalition). The term is not used anywhere near as often as in the UK and Canada, and it is rare – though not unheard of – for members of those parties to self-describe as "Tories". Chief Justice Garfield Barwick titled his memoir A Radical Tory. A moderate faction of the Australian Greens has been pejoratively dubbed the Tree Tories by the hard left faction.

Modern proponents
 Cornerstone Group – Conservative Party (UK) faction
 The Dorchester Review – history and commentary magazine founded in Canada
 The Salisbury Review – political quarterly founded in the United Kingdom

See also
 Tory socialism
 Tory Party (disambiguation)

References

Further reading
W. Christian and C. Campbell (eds), Parties, Leaders and Ideologies in CanadaJ. Farthing, Freedom Wears a CrownG. Grant, Lament for a Nation: The Defeat of Canadian NationalismG. Horowitz, "Conservatism, Liberalism and Socialism in Canada: An Interpretation", CJEPS (1966)
 

External links
Tory Act University of Tulsa; Order of the Continental Congress, Philadelphia, 2 January 1776
The Elections in England—Tories and Whigs Marxists.org (Karl Marx in the New York Tribune'', 1852)

American Revolution
Conservatism
Conservatism in Canada
Conservatism in the United Kingdom
Corporatism
Jacobitism
Political history of Canada
Politics of the Kingdom of Great Britain
Political terminology in Canada
Political terms in the United Kingdom
Toryism